The 2022 Eliteserien was the 78th season of top-tier football in Norway. This was the sixth season of Eliteserien after rebranding from Tippeligaen. Molde were crowned the champions at the end of the season, winning their 5th Norwegian league title.

The season started on 2 April 2022 and ended on 13 November 2022, not including play-off matches.

Bodø/Glimt were the defending champions, having won the previous season. HamKam, Aalesund and Jerv joined as the promoted clubs from the 2021 Norwegian First Division. They replaced Brann, Stabæk and Mjøndalen who were relegated to the First Division.

Teams
Sixteen teams competed in the league in this season – the top thirteen teams from the previous season, and three teams promoted from the First Division. The promoted teams were HamKam (returning to the top flight after a thirteen season absence), Aalesund (returning to the top flight after a one season absence) and Jerv (first season in the top flight). They replaced Brann, Stabæk and Mjøndalen, ending their top flight spells of six, eight and three years respectively.

Stadiums and locations

''Note: Table lists in alphabetical order.

Personnel and kits

Managerial changes

Transfers

Winter

Summer

League table

Results

Relegation play-offs

Sandefjord, the 14th-placed team in Eliteserien defeated Kongsvinger, the winners of the First Division promotion play-offs 5-2 (aggregate) over two legs to qualify to remain in the Eliteserien in the following season.

Season statistics

Top scorers

Hat-tricks

Notes
4 Player scored 4 goals(H) – Home team(A) – Away team

Top assists

Clean sheets

Discipline

Player

Most yellow cards: 9
 Dario Canadija (Aalesund)

Most red cards: 2
 Odin Bjørtuft (Odd)
 Anton Skipper (Sarpsborg 08)

Club

Most yellow cards: 59
Viking

Most red cards: 5
Sarpsborg 08

Awards

Annual awards

References

Eliteserien seasons
1
Norway
Norway